The Biju Janata Dal (BJD) is a regional political party in the Indian state of Odisha founded and led by Naveen Patnaik, the current Chief Minister of Odisha and the son of former Chief Minister of Odisha Biju Patnaik, after whom the party is named. It was founded on 26 December 1997.

Electoral record 
The BJD won nine seats in the 1998 general election and Naveen was named Minister for Mines. In the 1999 general elections, the BJD won 10 seats. The party won a majority of seats in the Odisha Legislative Assembly in the 2000 and 2004 elections in alliance with the Bharatiya Janata Party (BJP). The BJD won 11 Lok Sabha seats in the 2004 elections.
In the aftermath of the 2008 Kandhamal riots, the BJD parted ways with the BJP in the Lok Sabha and Assembly elections held in 2009, citing communalism and differences in seat sharing. During the election, BJD won 14 seats and secured a strong 108 legislative seats out of 147 seats in the 2009 Odisha legislative elections. Biju Janata Dal won a huge victory in the 2014 general election, securing 20 of the 21 Odishan Lok Sabha seats and 117 of the 147 Odisha Legislative Assembly seats. They were re-elected to power in Odisha in 2019, winning 112 of the 147 seats in the Odisha state assembly; however, their seats in the Lok Sabha were reduced to 12.

Rule 
Naveen Patnaik stepped down as Minister of Mines and left the Lok Sabha after the BJD-BJP victory in the Legislative Assembly Elections in 2000 and became the Chief Minister of Odisha. Naveen Patnaik won his second, third, fourth, and fifth terms as Chief Minister of Odisha in 2004, 2009, 2014, and 2019 state elections respectively.

Leadership
The highest decision-making body of the party is its Core Committee.

 Naveen Patnaik – Founder, National Chairperson, Leader of the party in the Odisha Legislative Assembly.
 Pinaki Misra – Leader of the party in the Lok Sabha
 Prasanna Acharya – Leader of the party in the Rajya Sabha
 Bhartruhari Mahtab – Member in the Lok Sabha
 Niranjan Pujari - Minister of Finance, Excise in Government of Odisha
 Pranab Prakash Das – General Secretary (Organisation)
 Sanjay Das Burma – General Secretary (headquarters)
 Amaresh Patri - Biju Yuba Janata Dal

Electoral Performances

Lok Sabha (Lower House)

Odisha Vidhan Sabha (Lower House)

List of chief ministers
Chief Minister of Odisha

See also
Biju Sena, front group of Biju Janata Dal.

Notes

References

External links 
 

 
State political parties in Odisha
Political parties established in 1997
1997 establishments in Orissa
Regionalist parties in India
Janata Parivar
Janata Dal